Sports proceedings began soon after Calciopoli, an association football scandal, was made public in May 2006. In July 2006, the Italian Football Federation's (FIGC) Federal Court of Justice started the sports trial. Juventus was relegated to Serie B with points-deduction, while other clubs (Arezzo, Fiorentina, Lazio, Milan,  Pescara, Reggina, Siena, and Triestina) only received points deductions. Most of implicated club's presidents and executives, as well as referees, referee designators, referee assistants, and FIGC higher-ups were initially proposed to be banned for life but only Juventus CEO  and Juventus general director Luciano Moggi were confirmed to be banned for life. Two criminal trials took place in Naples, the first related to Calciopoli proper, while the second involved consultancy company GEA World, which was alleged to hold power over all transfers and Italian football players and agents; all defendants were acquitted of the stronger charges. The Naples trial resulted in Calciopoli bis, which implicated almost every Serie A club, including Inter Milan, to which it was awarded the 2006 scudetto. Moggi's legal defence attempted to present those new developments at the Naples court but they were refused because the court ruled that it was there to determinate whether Moggi's lifetime ban should be confirmed and the gravity of his actions, as was sentenced in the controversial 2006 sports trial.

The Naples trial much reduced Moggi's power and that of his charged criminal association (la Cupola, literally "the Dome"); nonetheless, based on the 2006 sports trial, the Naples Court of Appeal confirmed Moggi and Giraudo's lifetime ban, and Moggi's criminal association charge. In 2015, the Supreme Court ruled in its final resolution that Moggi was acquitted of "some individual charges for sports fraud, but not from being the 'promoter' of the 'criminal conspiracy' that culminated in Calciopoli", although there were only 6 convictions (including Moggi and Giraudo) out of the initial 37 defendants; Massimo De Santis was the only referee to be convicted, while the other five's charges were annulled because of the statute of limitations. In 2018, the Supreme Court rejected Juventus's appeal, ending the dispute in the ordinary justice system. In 2020, the CONI's College of Guarantee declared the latest Juventus's appeal to not be admissible, also exhausting all the levels of judgment, and ending the dispute in the sports justice system. Both Moggi and Giraudo appealed to the European Court of Human Rights for the conduct of the trials, which remain a debated and controversial topic.

Overview

Sports trial, 2006–2012 
In July 2006, the FIGC's Federal Court of Justice started the sports trial. Juventus was originally to be relegated to Serie C, even though relegation is always for the immediately lower division according to the Italian sports law, for sports illicit, while three other clubs (Fiorentina, Lazio, and Milan) were to be relegated to Serie B. The FIGC prosecutor  called for all implicated four clubs to be thrown out of Serie A. Palazzi called for all four clubs to be relegated to Serie B with points-deduction (6 points for Juventus, 3 points for Milan, and 15 points for both Fiorentina and Lazio). Palazzi also called for Juventus to be stripped of the 2004–05 Serie A title, and to be downgraded to the last place in the 2005–06 Serie A championship. In August 2006, Palazzi called for Reggina to be relegated to Serie B with a 15-point penalty; this was later changed to the same 15-point penalty without relegation, a €30,000 fine, and club president Pasquale Foti fined €30,000 and banned from football for  years.

After appeals, punishment for Fiorentina, Lazio, and Milan was changed to points penalty and one or two home matches behind closed doors; Milan was also admitted to the 2006–07 UEFA Champions League, which the club went on win, despite UEFA's initial opposition due to its involvement in the scandal. Juventus controversially dropped its appeal and was the only club to be relegated to the 2006–07 Serie B, starting with a 30-point penalty, later reduced to 17, and to 9. Most of implicated club's presidents and executives, as well as referees, referee designators, referee assistants, and FIGC higher-ups, were initially proposed to be banned for life. By October 2006, they were handed a ban for a few years, fined, or warned. Several of them, such as Lazio president Claudio Lotito and then-Milan vice-president and Lega Calcio president Adriano Galliani, later returned to old or new positions in their own clubs and in Italian football institutions; Juventus's CEO  and general director's Luciano Moggi were the only executives to be banned. In June 2011, six months before the end of the initial five-year ban, the FIGC announced that Moggi and Giraudo were banned for life, which was confirmed by the FIGC's  in July 2011. In April 2012, CONI's  upheld bans for Moggi, Giraudo, and former FIGC vice-president Innocenzo Mazzini.

Criminal trials, 2008–2015 
Two criminal trials took place in Naples, the first related to Calciopoli proper, while the second involved GEA World, a consultancy company with offices in Rome, Dubai, and London, operating in sports business industry, which was alleged to hold power over all transfers and Italian football players and agents. Some analysts commented that the ordinary and criminal trial, which would be held in Naples, should have been held Turin due to the latter having territorial jurisdiction, as was the case in the sports doping investigation started in 1998; Turin's Office of the Judge for Preliminary Investigations twice rejected, when the sports doping investigation was coming to an end in 2004, telephone tapping due to no legal relevance being found for the charge of association for sporting delinquency (associazione per delinquere finalizzata alla frode in competizione sportiva, literally association for delinquency aimed at fraud in sports competition, henceforth criminal association) and for insufficient evidence, respectively. Critics question why two judges specialized in the fight against Camorra would take up a football case. Moggi's legal defence said both Turin and Rome, where the investigation started, were more appropriate territorial jurisdictions than Naples. The GEA World criminal trials also involving Alessandro Moggi concluded with all defendants acquitted of the criminal association charge, and the Moggis were only charged of duress and attempted duress, which were annulled and declared by the Supreme Court of Cassation in 2014 due to the statute of limitations.

The Naples trial resulted in Calciopoli bis, which implicated almost every Serie A club, including Inter Milan, to which it was awarded the 2006 scudetto; the FIGC prosecutor Palazzi charged Inter Milan, Livorno, and Milan to have violated both Article 1 and Article 6 of the Code of Sports Justice, which could have resulted in their demotion to Serie B; the statute of limitations did not allow Palazzi's charges to be confirmed. Palazzi's 2011 report stated that Inter Milan would have been the club to risk the most, as the charged illicits were committed by its own president, the late Giacinto Facchetti, whose son  later sued Moggi for his statements about Facchetti's involvement but the Milan court ruled that Moggi's statements about Facchetti lobbying for referees were truthful. Moggi's legal defence attempted to present those new developments at the Naples court but they were refused because the court was there to rule whether Moggi's lifetime ban should be confirmed and the gravity of his actions, as sentenced in the 2006 sports trial, which has been criticized for its hastiness and sentences, based on evidence and arguments later found to be discredited due to newly emerging wiretaps.

The Naples trial much reduced Moggi's power and that of his criminal association charge, with several allegations charged by the prosecution, such as locking referees in dressing rooms, controlling the referee selection processes, influencing referees, bribery, lavish gift-offerings, player agency control, accounting fraud, undetectable web of communication, direct referee contact, match-fixing, and attempted match-fixing, being discredited. The criminal trial confirmed Juventus's extraneousness, that Moggi had acted for his personal interest in saving Fiorentina from relegation, and the two championships won by the club were regular (as stated in the first instance sports trial, which investigated the 2004–05 championship) and no fixed or altered match was found. Then-FIGC president Franco Carraro, who in one wiretap stated to then-referee designator Paolo Bergamo that Fiorentina and Lazio needed to be helped in order to avoid their relegation, was not prosecuted in Naples. In 2015, the Supreme Court ruled in its final resolution that Moggi was acquitted of "some individual charges for sports fraud, but not from being the 'promoter' of the 'criminal conspiracy' that culminated in Calciopoli". Five of the six convictions from the Naples trial were annulled due the statute of limitations; only the referee Massimo De Santis, out of the initial 37 defendants, was convicted with a reduced sentence.

Reactions and aftermath 
Supporters of the trials and antijuventini, the latter a term to describe Juventus's hatred, felt vindicated by the rulings that the Dome was real. Critics including journalists and judges, among others, said that there remains several inconsistencies and other aspects not fully clear, which is also conceded by supporters of the trials. Ultimately, 30 out 36 referees were acquitted of the charges, with the criminal association being reduced to Moggi, Giraudo, Mazzini, referee designator Pierluigi Pairetto, and referee . De Santis, the only other referee to be convicted, originally as promoter of the criminal association and later reduced to simple associate, and the only defendant to be convicted, as he renounced to the statute of limitations, was upset after the ruling. In its final judgments in 2015, the Supreme Court said that the system was rather widespread and that the developments in the behavior of other Serie A clubs, that of Inter Milan and Milan in particular, which could not be taken in account due to the statute of limitations in the ruling against Moggi and the defendants, were not deepened by the investigations.

As a club, Juventus was found extraneous from Moggi and Giraudo. Juventus was not found to have violated both Article 1 and Article 6, and instead was retroactively relegated due to a newly created rule, referred to in the court as an associative illicit (illecito associativo) but best known as structured illicit (illecito strutturato), a term that was added to the Code of Sport Justice after the scandal became public. As this was based on the theory that Juventus had a privileged or exclusive relationship with referee designators, which was later discredited, the club appealed to get the two championship back. The 2006 scudetto was assigned ad personam by then-FIGC commissioner Guido Rossi, who was involved in both Inter Milan and Inter Milan's main sponsor TIM Group, and not by the FIGC or Lega Calcio, on the basis of a joint decision of Three Sages (tre saggi), one of whom voted in favour, while the other two abstained and voted against the re-assignation to another club, respectively; the other championship, that of 2005–06, was not object of investigation in the sports and ordinary trials, which confirmed there were not irregularities in the two championships. Juventus asked for the 2005–06 championship to be revoked from Inter Milan, wanting both championships back, and sought a €444 million lawsuit for damage claims due to unequal treatment (disparità di trattamento); all its appeals were rejected due to the courts declaring themselves not competent on technical issues rather than juridical grounds.

Like the scandal proper, which originated not from the major sports press or investigative journalism press but from Il Romanista, a newspaper entirely dedicated to Roma supporters, and soon after popularized by Milan-based La Gazzetta dello Sport, the trials remain debated and a controversial topic; the 2006 SISMI-Telecom scandal is related with this case due the group accused of industrial espionage in both cases being the Tiger Team led by major Inter Milan shareholder Marco Tronchetti Provera, which some critics questioned for the case's heavy reliance on wiretaps and their legality. The trials themselves are criticized for giving legal defence only 7 days to read a 7,000-page dossier, for being one-sided against Juventus and Moggi, and for not hearing all witnesses or the wiretaps, which emerged only years later; critics have since questioned why they were hidden in the first place, when they have always been at the FIGC headquarters since 2006, and why they were not used in the sports trial, or why of the 170,000 wiretaps, the FIGC's Federal Prosecutor's Office listened to 80 of them, most of which involving Moggi, and this process lasted only a couple of weeks.

The sentences themselves are object of controversy and criticism, among them the many loopholes and the fact they were reported in advance by La Gazzetta dello Sport. Of particular criticism is Juventus's relegation and harsher punishment; even though no match was altered or fixed, this was based on sentimento popolare ("people's feelings") that Juventus was favoured, which was mentioned in the sports sentence; sudditanza psicologica ("psychological subjection"), something to which referees were subjected that cannot be proven and is subjective; and the ad hoc rule to relegate Juventus through repeated Article 1 violations without committing an Article 6 violation. Although several sports law experts said that the scandal would have taken months to resolve the case, including appeals to Lazio's Regional Administrative Court (TAR) and a potential appeal to the Court of Arbitration for Sport, to favour the start of the next championship, the 2006–07 Serie A, which risked to be postponed sine die, the FIGC eliminated an instance degree of the trial.

In December 2018, the Supreme Court rejected Juventus's appeal against Rome's Court of Appeal, ending the dispute through ordinary justice system. In January 2020, the CONI's College of Guarantee declared that Juventus's appeal was not admissible, exhausting all the levels of judgment, and sanctioning the de facto end of the dispute in the sports justice system. By March 2020, both Moggi and Giraudo appealed to the European Court of Human Rights for the conduct of the trials and the few time given to legal defences; Giraudo's appeal was accepted in September 2021, and he is being represented by Amedeo Rosboch, the same lawyer who defended Jean-Marc Bosman in the revolutionary Bosman ruling in association football. In March 2022, Juventus presented a new appeal to the TAR. By October 2022, both the March and another June appeal were declared inadmissible.

Sports trial, 2004–2006

Background 
The first signs of Calciopoli emerged in 2005 through some press rumors relating to football investigations conducted by the Turin prosecutor; the investigation, conducted by the prosecutor , ended with a dismissal due to the non-existence of criminally relevant situations but also with the simultaneous sending of material, deemed relevant on a disciplinary level, to the FIGC. The investigation followed a few months later another called Offside (named after the English football term in reference to the offside position), started in the summer of 2004 by the Naples Prosecutor's Office and focused on betting in association football.

In the following weeks, the names of other club executives, referees, and FIGC officials appeared, including the-then FIGC president Franco Carraro.

The wiretaps included some journalists and opinion leaders of television and print media in contact with Moggi, such as Aldo Biscardi and former referee and designator Fabio Baldas (conductor and moviolista, respectively, of Il processo di Biscardi on La7),  (il Giornale), Guido D'Ubaldo (Corriere dello Sport), Franco Melli (Il Tempo and guest at Biscardi's talk show), Lamberto Sposini (TG5 and guest at Biscardi's talk show),  (Rai Sport), Ignazio Scardina (Rai Sport), and Ciro Venerato (Rai Sport). The only one to be investigated and tried for criminal association was Scardina, who was later acquitted in the first instance by the court of Naples. Among the intercepted, there was also the then Minister of the Interior Giuseppe Pisanu, who asked through Moggi refereeing favours for Sassari Torres, which at that time was in Serie C1.

First consequences 
After the publication of the first wiretaps, Carraro resigned as president of the FIGC on 8 May 2006, and was followed two days later by that of Mazzini, who was one of his deputies as the FIGC vice-president. On 11 May, Juventus's board of directors resigned.

On 12 May, it was announced that the Naples Public Prosecutor's Office had entered 41 people in the register of suspects, including club executives, FIGC officials, referees, referee designators, referee assistants, a journalist, and DIGOS agents. Among them were FIGC higher-ups Carraro and Mazzini, Moggi and Giraudo of Juventus, Fiorentina president Andrea della Valle, Fiorentina's honorary president Diego Della Valle, Fiorentina executive director Sandro Mencucci, Lazio president Claudio Lotito, A.C. Milan's employee Leonardo Meani, GEA director Alessandro Moggi, former referee designators Paolo Bergamo and Pierluigi Pairetto,  president Tullio Lanese, and referees Massimo De Santis, Domenico Messina, Gianluca Rocchi, and Paolo Tagliavento. The club investigated were Juventus, Fiorentina, Lazio, and Milan, while the matches were 20, 19 of which were related to the 2004–05 season, and one was related to the 2004–05 Serie B.}}
 
 
 
 
 
 
 
 
 
 
 
 
 
 
 
 
 
 
 
 
 
 
 
 
 
 
 
 
 
 
 
 
 
 
 
 
 
 
 
 
 
 
 
 
 
 
 
 
 
 
 
 
 
 
 
 
 
 
 
 
 
 
 
 
 
 
 
 
 
 
 
 
 
 
 
  
  
  
 
 
 
 
 
 
 
 
 
 
 
 
 
 
 
 
 
 
 
 
 
 
 
 
 
 
 
 
 
 
 
 
 
 
 
 
 
 
 
 
 
 
 
 
 
 
 
 
 
 
 
 
 
 
 
 
 
 
 
 
 
 
 
 
 
 
 
 
 
 
 
 
 
 
 
 
 
 
 
 
 
 
 
 
 
 
 
 
 
 
 
 
 
  Updated 19 October 2012.

Further reading

External links 
 Calciopoli: what it is, what happened, and how it ended (in Italian) – via CalcioBlog
 Complete record of the FIGC decision, July 2006 (in Italian) – via La Gazzetta dello Sport
 Complete record of the FIGC decision, June 2011 (in Italian) – via the FIGC website
 Complete sentence for the November 2011 trial written by the Naples court (in Italian) – via La Gazzetta dello Sport
 Complete sentence for the March 2015 trial written by the Supreme Court (in Italian) – via Rivista di Diritto ed Economia dello Sport

2006 scandals
Association football controversies
Sports scandals in Italy